"Empyre" is a comic book story arc published in July 2020 by Marvel Comics. This storyline follows the events of Incoming!.

Premise
The Avengers, the Fantastic Four and various other heroes of the Marvel universe come together to fight and prevent the incoming invasion of the Kree/Skrull armada being led by Hulkling, who has been crowned as "Dorrek VIII".

Editorial history
The first comic of the story arc, Road to Empyre: The Kree–Skrull War, was announced in December 2019. It was to be published in March 2020 and included references to older Marvel stories, Kree–Skrull War and The Celestial Madonna from the 1970s, and the 2019 comic Meet the Skrulls. It had previously been set up in the Incoming! comic as well.

Plot

Lead-up

Teddy Altman is made a mysterious offer at the cost of leaving Billy Kaplan. He accepts the offer which was to become the new ruler of the Kree–Skrull Alliance, adopting the mantle of "Dorrek VIII," and beginning the preparations of invading the Earth for "the final war".

Stamford, Connecticut's Warners are Skrulls in disguise. General G'iah sends Skrull High Command an encrypted message about Project Blossom. Colonel Klrr's wife goes by the name of "Carl Warner," and together they have three daughters named Alice, Ivy, and Madison. Unfortunately, Moloth, who was once a trusted member, betrayed the family and took the lives of both Klrr and Ivy. However, before his passing, Carl was able to discover that Ivy was still breathing, and her blood was later used to identify and eliminate Skrulls. As a result, Moloth was brought to justice and met his demise.

After rescuing Ivy, they returned to their goal and began going after their enemies. G'iah and her daughters locate a Kree–Skrull War sample in a lab. G'iah tells his girls how the Skrulls were peaceful during Emperor Dorrek I's rule. When he came on Hala, the Kree were brutes and the Cotati dwelt there. Whoever created the most with their gifts became Hala's ruler. The Cotati created a garden on Earth's moon while the Kree built a Skrull monument. Morag killed the Cotati and Skrulls with Dorrek I, turning the Kree into the greatest fighting force ever.

The Kree–Skrull War raged all the way to Earth. After the story, G'iah reveals that the sample the Kree have is a piece of the Cotati as they planned to make sure the Cotati become extinct. At a motel, G'iah and Madison work on decrypting the recent sub-space transmission. Ivy and Alice talked about how the Kree couldn't obtain peace as well as a prophecy of a Celestial Messiah.

A group of Kree called the Priests of Prama found the Cotati that did not get wiped out by Morag and planted them on different planets including Earth. The Cotati on Earth lived undiscovered until the day they encountered Mantis. She and Swordsman bonded with a Cotati which led to the birth of Sequoia (also called "Quoi"). Thanos sent his warriors to look for them causing the Avengers to intervene. Sequoia was last mentioned to have been in an area of outer space called the Rot undoing the damages caused by Thanos.

As Madison finds something, their motel is blown up by an unnamed Kree operative. Thanks to her shapeshifting being perfected, Ivy turned into an indestructible creature and preserved her family inside her until she got to safety. While driving, G'iah resumes listening to Madison's discovery that there is a transmission to the Kree by Hulkling. They learn that Hulkling is the result of a union between the Kree Mar-Vell and the Skrull Princess Anelle who fell in love after Super-Skrull captured him and delivered him to Emperor Dorrek VII. Anelle had a handmaiden spirit him to Earth where she continued to raise Hulkling who would later help form the Young Avengers and fall in love with Wiccan.

Arriving at the building, the Warners find the Kree who blew up their motel room. G'iah mentioned who General Bel-Dann represented the Kree and Warlord Raksor represented the Skrulls when it came to watching the trial of the Phoenix Force. The two of them fought until Uatu the Watcher broke it up. An agreement between Empress R'Klll and the Supreme Intelligence allowed the victor of the battle to be the victor of their race. Uatu, the Fantastic Four, and the Inhumans played a trick to get them to work together where the Fantastic Four and the Inhumans attacked them. G'iah raids the building to find a Kree family as her daughters intervene. The patriarch of the Kree family that blew up their motel room suddenly receives a message on his Kree-tech cellphone from Dorrek VIII stating to all Kree and Skrull soldiers in the field that the Kree and Skrull armadas have united to face a common enemy. They are coming to Earth to destroy them as he speaks. G'iah and her daughters find in the holographic transmission that Hulking is Dorrek VIII.

Tony Stark began having vivid nightmares thanks to a vision given to him by Immortus about the massacre of the Cotati by the Kree long ago on Earth's moon, which also led to the Kree long war with Skrulls. Shortly after waking up, he got a call from Captain Marvel about a psychic request that has been sent out from the Blue Area of the Moon. As the Avengers approached, they realized that the oxygen-rich area was revitalized and is now more of a green color thanks to all the plants growing there.

Shortly after landing, the team encountered a Kree Sentry merged with some weird growth. The team received some help from the Cotati that took over Jacques Duquesne's corpse. This particular Cotati had used the Swordsman body to marry Mantis and conceive a child. Claiming to still retain the Swordsman's memories which include his initial betrayal of the Avengers, the Swordsman then introduced his former teammates to his son with Mantis: Sequoia the Celestial Messiah. Given their existing relationship, Thor agreed to bring down a few storms to help continue the Cotati's growth on the Moon. Later, the Avengers finally came to learn that the Kree and Skrulls have been united in their hatred towards the Cotati.
Quoi noted that the Kree hated them for losing to the Cotati all those years ago and the Skrulls hated that the Cotati's victory led to the Kree's intergalactic crusades. Sequoia even hinted at the identity of the alliance's leader Hulkling without specifically conveying his identity. He went on to explain that the Kree–Skrull Alliance was headed there to raze the Cotati from the Moon. After hearing all this, Carol reminded Tony of the moment they witnessed the deaths of a Kree and Skrull working together at the "hands" of a plant and heard the warning "Beware the trees".

During the conversation, Quoi pointed out that the Kree held a grudge against them for losing to the Cotati many years ago, while the Skrulls resented the Cotati's triumph, which had prompted the Kree to embark on intergalactic crusades. Sequoia subtly hinted at the leader of the Kree-Skrull Alliance, Hulkling, without explicitly revealing his identity. He also disclosed that the Alliance was on its way to the Moon to wipe out the Cotati. Upon hearing all of this, Carol reminded Tony about the incident they witnessed, where a plant had killed a Kree and Skrull who were working together, and a warning was given, "Beware the trees."

Thanks to a rousing speech from Iron Man, the team all agreed to defend the Cotati and figure out the politics afterward unaware that the Fantastic Four are already among the Kree–Skrull Alliance.

At Casino Cosmico, a dimension dedicated entirely to gambling and gladiator fights, the Elder of the Universe known as the Profiteer reveals herself as the new owner of the place after having acquired it from her brother the Grandmaster. She re-enacted the Kree–Skrull War, pitting a Kree child named Jo-Venn against a Skrull child named N'kalla for the pleasure of her patrons. Meanwhile, the Fantastic Four are stranded in space but luckily, they are picked up by a cargo ship who tells them about Casino Cosmico.

They head there, hoping to enter the Thing into a few fights to win them transport back to Earth. Upon arriving at Casino Cosmico, the Fantastic Four learns that the Kree–Skrull War has ended. Upon discovering that Casino Cosmico is attempting to recapture the prominence of the war, Mister Fantastic investigates it only for the Profiteer to try to make money off of the team, but she soon realized that they prove to be too troublesome.

While she dealt with them, Franklin Richards and Valeria Richards managed to break the bank and became the new owners of Casino Cosmico. They soon approached the Profiteer, offering to sign the casino back over to her in exchange for Jo-Venn's and N'kalla's freedom. Much to her chagrin, the Profiteer accepted.

Later as they were heading back home, they came across the Kree–Skrull armada en route to Earth.

Main plot
As the joint fleet of the Kree and the Skrulls approaches Earth, the Avengers prepare to defend the Cotati while the Fantastic Four send Franklin, Valeria, Jo-Venn and N'kalla back to Earth while they make contact with Hulkling to establish the situation. The initial conflict is brief with Hulkling and his inner circle Super-Skrull, Captain Glory, and Tanalth the Pursuer, but it is soon established that the Cotati intend to establish themselves as a new empire to avenge themselves on the rest of the universe in the name of all the plants that have suffered at the hands of humanoids, just using the Avengers to delay their enemies until they were ready to grow.

A ship arrives in the Solar System as its pilot informs the ship's computer that the pilot was born her. In the Blue Area of the Moon, Quoi has trapped Captain America, Thor, and Iron Man in the Cotati's plants stating that it is not too late to take their offer. Quoi recaps what he has learned from his father. Black Panther, Captain Marvel, and She-Hulk fight the Swordsman Cotati who has unleashed the plants that are harming the Kree and the Skrull. Quoi revealed that Raksor died from a tree growing in him and he was not the first to experience that. Then the Cotati strangled Bel-Dann with his own potted plant while noting that the Kree and the Skrull were faster in recruiting Hulkling. Thor calls Mjolnir which enables him to free himself, Captain America, and Iron Man. As Quoi escapes, Iron Man is contacted by Black Panther who inform him that the Cotati are on Earth. As Captain America, Thor, and Iron Man head to Earth, Captain Marvel is confronted by Captain Glory on if she was proud on what the Cotati did. At the Alliance's ship, Hulkling uses the Sword of Space to free Thing from the seeds that are eating him alive. Captain Marvel arrives and suggests they release some of her energy on the plants. Hulkling does so by stabbing Captain Marvel which fries the plants. When Captain Marvel is revived, Mister Fantastic revealed that he resuscitated her using Tanalth's hammer as an improvised defibrillator. Tanalth revealed that the Universal Weapon was formerly wielded by Ronan the Accuser and gives it to Captain Marvel as an honorary member of the Kree Accuser Corps. Super-Skrull states to Hulkling that the death of a world is on his hands.

Mister Fantastic adds to his thought journal that Captain Marvel has brought the Kree and Skrull troops that she rescued to Earth while stating that Hulkling's inner circle are using him as a figurehead. At Avengers Mountain, Mister Fantastic has met with Tony Stark. While Captain America is leading Earth's heroes in their fight against the Cotati across the world, Thor is on a mythical quest seeking out powers that only gods can access. Tony rants about falling for the Cotati's lies as Mister Fantastic states that nobody saw the Cotati's true motives coming. At Wakanda near the border of Azania, Thing is with Shuri, Okoye, and the Agents of Wakanda confront the Cotati who have breached the forcefield. At Lake Victoria, Quoi and the Swordsman Cotati learn the status report of their invasion. When Swordsman states that they should send in their best, Quoi states that their forces are winning in the Savage Land and Genosha as they plan to gain access to Wakanda's Vibranium mound. On the roof of Wakanda's royal palace, She-Hulk states that the Vibranium would not be useful to the Cotati. Black Panther states that they are after the Vibranium-enriched soil in order to grow the same Death Blossom that was used on the Kree/Skrull fleets. The pilot of the ship arrives and is revealed to be Mantis who plans to reason with her son Quoi. On the Kree/Skrull Alliance's command ship, Captain Marvel, Human Torch, Hulkling, and the Alliance's inner circle discuss their plans to weaken the Cotati. Mur-G'nn states that she can boost the Sword of Space's energies for a time and allow Captain Marvel to absorb a higher dose in order to release on the Death Blossom. Before Hulkling can answer Human Torch's answer about Captain Marvel's suicide mission, he is contacted by Black Panther asking for the Sword of Space. He allows Black Panther to have it as it does not require an Avenger to be sacrificed. Then Hulkling states to Captain Marvel that the Sword of Space has magic properties and can come and go as he commands. As the Alliance disagrees with Hulkling's decision, Tanalth the Pursuer has Super-Skrull bring up the incident in the Kral System that revolved around the Pyre. While surprised that Tanalth knows about it, Super-Skrull talks about it stating that when a star builds up enough energy and detonates, the Pyre happens. Super-Skrull revealed that he had to use it on the Kral system where the Skrull colonies that imitated Earth's culture were wiped out during the Cotati's invasion much to the shock of Captain Marvel. Captain Glory speaks with Tanalth the Pursuer in private about how Ronan the Accuser died standing with the Utopian faction and his gene scan does not identify her as a Kree. Tanalth the Pursuer is revealed to be the thought-dead Skrull Empress R'Kill in disguise who survived Galactus' consumption of Tarnax IV. When Captain Glory states that her grandson spent too much time with the humans, R'Kill notes that it brought out Hulking's heroism and states that they will have to do something about that.

Captain Marvel speaks to Super-Skrull about how Captain America is having a hard time gathering the military to help fight the Cotati. Super-Skrull mentions that the troops are bickering with each other, and that Tanalth the Pursuer has sequestered herself from the command deck. Captain Marvel states that they can't wake Hulkling when it is mentioned that the Cotati are amassing in Wakanda. Hulking arrives and states that they have to stop the Cotati at all costs. When Captain Marvel is suspicious, she has the Universal Weapon scan him just in case that someone else is posing as him and it says that it is 100% Hulkling. This causes Captain Marvel and Human Torch to retaliate against the plans to annihilate Earth causing Captain Glory, Mur-G'nn, and the Super-Skrull to defend him as Mur-G'nn teleports them away. Captain Marvel and Human Torch end up in an apartment which turns out to be Wiccans. At Avengers Mountain, Tony Stark is working on another Iron Man armor as Mister Fantastic informs him about the Pyre which they plan to use on the Sun. In Wakanda, Black Panther is leading his allies and the Wakandan army in fighting the Cotati. At Lake Victoria, Quoi and the Swordsman Cotati hear that the battle is not over as She-Hulk, Invisible Woman, and Thing arrive with Mantis to confront them. Quoi agrees to hear his mother out and has his father allow it to happen. Quoi mentions that the Skrulls weren't apologetic towards them in the Kral System. It is soon revealed that She-Hulk was actually killed and taken over by the Cotati during the Avengers' trip to the Blue Area of the Moon. As the Cotati-possessed She-Hulk attacks Thing, the Swordsman Cotati states to Quoi that they have the Avengers' most powerful member under their control. Mantis telepathically speaks to Quoi stating that it is not too late to stop all of this. Quoi and the Swordsman Cotati take their leave from Lake Victoria. Back at Wiccan's apartment, Wiccan uses a spell to probe Captain Marvel's mind, Wiccan states that the Hulkling up there is not the one he married.

While recapping his marriage to Hulkling, Wiccan states that he can find the real Hulkling with his magic since they are connected. Thing continues his fight with the Cotati-possessed She-Hulk while Invisible Woman is trying to get a forcefield into She-Hulk's mind to block the Cotati from controlling her. Meanwhile, Shuri sends reinforcements to assist Black Panther in his fight with the Cotati at the foothills of the Vibranium mound. The Ukhozi Squadron shows up to assist Black Panther from the air. Some Cotati are sacrificed when a portal is opened, and Black Panther is stabbed by the Swordsman Cotati as Quoi shows up. On the Kree/Skrull Alliance's flagship, Wiccan arrives with Human Torch, Captain Marvel, and the real Hulkling. As Human Torch burns the Inhibitor Mask off of Hulkling, Captain Marvel uses the Universal Weapon on the impostor who states that the Pyre's trigger has been activated in the Sun and faces his Accuser. Quoi and the Swordsman Cotati find no pulse in Black Panther as Thing continues the fight against the Cotati-possessed She-Hulk and Ka-Zar continues his fight with the Cotati in the Savage Land. Mister Fantastic informs Tony Stark that there's a Death Blossom appearing in Wakanda and with the Pyre having been triggered, they have nine minutes to save the world.

At Avengers Mountain, Mister Fantastic dons the Iron Man armor that Tony Stark made him as Mister Fantastic states that the same Death Blossom that is on the Moon is now blooming on Wakanda's Vibranium mound. It will boost Quoi's powers enabling plant life to rule. Tony Stark recaps that the Sun will explode in any minute thanks to the Pyre. Tony sends Mister Fantastic to Wakanda while he works on fixing the Sun. When Mister Fantastic asks how he is going to do that, Tony states that he will "put the Sun in a suit". In New York, Franklin, Valeria, Spider-Man, and Wolverine are fighting the Priests of Pama and Dark Harvest who are using the captive Jo-Venn and N'kalla to power the Omni-Wave Projector in order to start the Kree-Skrull War anew. This is reached to the Kree/Skrull Alliance's flagship which affects the imposter Hulkling as the Kree and Skrull present start fighting each other as well as having effects on the hybrids. Hulkling is still in his Inhibitor Mask which makes him unaffected. Hulkling makes a suggestion to Captain Marvel, Human Torch, and Wiccan to combine their abilities in order to prevent the Pyre. At Lake Victoria, Invisible Woman, Mantis, and Thing are locked in combat with the Cotati-possessed She-Hulk. Back in New York, Jo-Venn and N'kalla release their positive memories which revives She-Hulk enough to break the Cotati off of her and to stop the fighting between the Kree and the Skrull. Back on the Kree/Skrull Alliance's warship, Captain Glory exposes the fact that the imposter Hulkling is R'Kill and is done being part of her plan. Mur-G'nn is ordered by Hulking to take Captain Glory and the Super-Skrull to Wiccan in order to help him out while he deals with R'Kill. As the Swordsman Cotati informs Quoi that the Dark Harvest has failed, Black Panther recovers and engages the Swordsman Cotati while Mister Fantastic arrives to confront Quoi as he unleashes a sonic frequency to block Quoi's control over plants. The rest of the Fantastic Four and the Avengers arrive as Captain America demands that Quoi surrenders. Captain Glory and the Super-Skrull arrive to help Captain Marvel and Human Torch to hold back the Sun while Tony Stark sends a copy of Mister Fantastic's suit into the Sun as Super-Skrull feels the Pyre weakening. R'Kill sheds her disguise and fights Hulkling who then slams the Inhibitor Mask on R'Kill. As Quoi states that the Cotati wizards have control over the Death Blossom, Thor uses Mjolnir to shock the Cotati. The Swordsman Cotati tries to use Quoi as a shield only for Black Panther to use the Sword of Space to impale the Swordsman Cotati and the Death Blossom. Later, Black Panther and Mister Fantastic got word that the X-Men have weeded the other Death Blossom from the Blue Area of the Moon. Mantis apologizes to her son for failing him and stopping his father from descending into madness. As Quoi is taken away by Thor and She-Hulk, Tony states in a holographic message to Captain America that they cost themselves the future of the Cotati and the universe. Captain America states that the Cotati everywhere are surrendering peacefully which the Kree and the Skrull have accepted. Mister Fantastic states to Invisible Woman that they are about to enter a new age of space while claiming that Quoi might still be the future. Agreeing with Mister Fantastic, Black Panther sends Excelsior, the Star-Sword back to Hulkling.

Subplot

Fantastic Four
An elderly Kree named Colonel Kal-Torr recaps when the Kree and the Skrull fought each other near the corpse of the Fallen Celestial which he informs the Supreme Intelligence whose entry is noted and absorbed. A Skrull named General J'Bahzz talks to Empress R'Kill of his victories as both sides usher in the newborns of their race like Jo-Venn for the Kree and N'kalla for the Skrulls. In the present, Thing and Human Torch break up an argument between Jo-Venn and N'kalla as Franklin Richards and Valeria Richards are instructed to take the children to Earth. At the temple of the High Priests of Pama, the head monk informs his fellow monks that the trees are speaking about the upcoming Dark Harvest. At Alicia Masters' studio in Soho, Alicia is working on a sculpture of Sky as she informs Sky about her blindness. Alicia is contacted by the Fantastic Four. Valeria uses a transmitter to call for back-up to help them protect Jo-Venn and N'kalla as Sky flies Alicia to Valeria and Franklin. She makes contact with Spider-Man and Wolverine, but Wolverine misunderstands the situation and stabs N'kalla before realizing that she is an innocent child as the High Priests of Pama show up.

As the Fantastic Four are fighting the Cotati on the Alliance's command ship, Franklin scolds Wolverine for attacking a Skrull kid. As Alicia is unaware of how N'Kalla knows her, Wolverine grabs Jo-Venn before he can attack as Spider-Man's Spider-Senses go off. Skye meets Spider-Man who mentions that they are surrounded by danger. They are attacked by the Dark Harvest, the elite Priests of Pama who answer to the Cotati. Spider-Man, Wolverine and Sky fight the Dark Harvest while Alicia and Valeria work to heal N'Kalla. Jo-Venn's mind is scanned where the Dark Harvest finds information on the Omni-Wave Projector. As the Dark Harvest raids the apartment, they have a run-in with Hulk and Ghost Rider. This causes the Dark Harvest to retreat as they have the information they need. Spider-Man and Wolverine found that Hulk and Ghost Rider are actually Franklin and Valeria using Image Inducers. As Sky and N'Kalla are recuperating, Franklin is told by Wolverine that they can't get the X-Men to help as Krakoa's gates are plant-based as well as the fact that the real Hulk and Ghost Rider haven't shown up. Mister Fantastic contacts Franklin and Valeria where he learns what happened. Mister Fantastic supplies Spider-Man and Wolverine new costumes as they plan to free Jo-Venn.

The Kree and the Skrull are engaging the Cotati until Franklin Richards, Valeria Richards, Spider-Man and Wolverine arrive. As Spider-Man and Wolverine fight the Cotati, one of the Skrull soldiers directs Franklin and Valeria where the Dark Harvest went. Arriving at Alchemax, Franklin, Valeria, Spider-Man, and Wolverine learn from a security guard that the Dark Harvest stole something from them. As Spider-Man recaps about what befell Parker Industries, the High Priests of Pama contact Quoi to let them know that they have the Omni-Wave Projector and that the Kree and the Skrull are at each other's throats. The High Priests of Pama enter Jo-Venn's mind and learned the Kree and the Skrull's history with the Cotati. They plan to start a war without an end as a demonstration is done on some Kree and Skrull soldiers. At 4 Yancy Street, N'kalla senses this happening as Alicia as she finds out that N'kalla had switched places with Sky. Franklin, Valeria, Spider-Man, and Wolverine were informed of this. At the Temple of Pama, N'kalla poses as a disciple in order to free Jo-Vann only to be defeated by Oak and captured. With N'kalla as their prisoner, the Priests of Pama can now strengthen the Omni-Wave Projector. Just then, Franklin, Valeria, Spider-Man, and Wolverine arrive to fight the Priests of Pama and the Dark Harvest. Wolverine engages Oak in battle while Spider-Man webs up Creeping Vine. The Priests of Pama then activate the Omni-Wave Projector as the Kree and the Skrull start turning against each other. It has even reached Wakanda and the Kree/Skrull Alliance's flagship. Franklin and Valeria were able to get Jo-Vann and N'kalla to experience good memories which brings about the final chapter of the Kree-Skrull War. Quoi was not pleased with the results and starts turning them into trees. Franklin and Valeria free Jo-Vann and N'kalla. Jo-Vann and N'kalla express interest to go to the "Land of Diz-Nee" which Franklin mentioned earlier.

Empyre: Avengers
Seven hours ago, a mixed army of Kree and Skrulls fought the Cotati. On the Wakandan Helicarrier, the Avengers, the Agents of Wakanda, and Mockingbird discuss their plans. In Manhattan, Vision and Doctor Nemesis meet with Luke Cage where plants have overtaken Central Park. As Vision phases through them to scout ahead, he is grabbed by a plant-like figure using a special vine to negate Vision's density control. 16 miles northwest of Navajoa, Quicksilver, Wonder Man, and Mockingbird find where the Kree and the Skrull are fighting the Cotati. Two of the Cotati magic-users throw orbs at Quicksilver to stop him as Wonder Man and Mockingbird come to his aid. When most of the Cotati are slain, Wonder Man and Mockingbird have a disagreement with the Kree and the Skrull soldiers on how to handle the defeated Cotati which leads to an altercation. Back on the Wakandan Helicarrier, Black Panther mentions how the Wakandan Satellite System enhanced with the magic of Doctor Strange and Odin is coming in handy. Black Knight states to Captain America that he has been focusing on becoming a hero again after fighting the Giants and Dark Elves as Black Panther detects that there are Cotati activities in Central America, South America, China, and Canada. Okoye detects plant-based activity in Antarctica as Ka-Zar states that the Savage Land is there. As Ka-Zar is unable to reach Shanna the She-Devil, Black Panther instructs Brother Voodoo to take Ka-Zar, Zabu, Black Knight, and Scarlet Witch with him to investigate. They arrive to find a slain Tyrannosaurus as Scarlet Witch senses they are surrounded. The group is attacked by the Cotati, and they fight them until the Cotati Ventri unleash Man-Thing who they have under their control. As Ventri states that the Savage Land and the world will be theirs, Ka-Zar is shocked to find that the Cotati have gained control of Shanna.

South of Khartom, the Hatut Zeraze are engaging the Cotati archers. In Little Asgard, the Warriors Three fight the Cotati invaders. In Washington DC, Captain America and the armed soldiers are holding the line. Okoye informs Black Panther that there are attacks in Caracas, Lisbon, Manila, and Yokohama. Black Panther states that they must trust their allies first before using the Wakandan Helicarrier to assist in the fight. In Central Park, Doctor Nemesis and Luke Cage notice a giant plant figure emerging from the vines as Vision fights him. When Luke Cage thinks it is a Cotati, Vision states that he is actually Plantman who claims that his goals are similar to the Cotati's goals. Vision tries to reason with Plantman only for him to create soldiers out of his plants. Near Navajoa, some of the Kree argue with the Skrull led by Glaz't on if Hulkling will lead their kind to a new era. Wonder Man works to break up the fight. Somewhere underground in the Savage Land, Black Knight and Zabu find Ka-Zar's son Matthew. It is then shown that they are all prisoners of the Cotati. Because of Shanna the She-Devil having the Savage Land's lifeforce in her, Ventri states that they were able to gain control of her. With Doctor Voodoo and Scarlet Witch immobilized and Black Knight imprisoned, Shanna tries to get Ka-Zar to join them as Matthew states to Black Knight that they have to do something. Doctor Voodoo used a trick to do a mental trick. Scarlet Witch does the same as she tries to free Shanna from the Cotati's control. As Ventri notices something happen with Scarlet Witch, Doctor Voodoo takes control of Man-Thing to free Matthew and Black Knight. Scarlet Witch brings Ka-Zar into Shanna's mind where he learns that some creatures in the Savage Land are dying, and trees are falling. As Matthew and Black Knight fight the Cotati, a Doctor Voodoo-controlled Man-Thing fights the Cotati's control and defeats Ventri. When Ka-Zar frees Shanna from the Cotati's control, he is stabbed by a Cotati.

In the Savage Land, Shanna the She-Devil and Matthew are shocked to witness Ka-Zar getting stabbed. In Manhattan, Doctor Nemesis, Luke Cage, and Vision are locked in combat with Plantman and his Sprout Soldiers. They managed to defeat Plantman, but are unable to make contact with Black Panther. Northwest of Navajoa, Quicksilver regains his stamina and breaks up the attack. Back in the Savage Land, Shanna the She-Devil uses the powers of the Savage Land on the Cotati that stabbed Ka-Zar as Scarlet Witch subdues Ventri. Scarlet Witch reveals that the sword used on him was Black Knight's Ebony Blade as Doctor Voodoo separates from Man-Thing to get Ka-Zar's soul out of it. As Matthew, Man-Thing, and Zabu are struck with spears, Shanna uses the same waters that empowered her in an attempt to heal Ka-Zar. It works as Ka-Zar states that the Savage Land is now defending itself as a group of dinosaurs show up. Ventri and the Cotati with him are entrapped by Doctor Voodoo as Man-Thing takes his leave. Ventri claims that what they learned from Man-Thing's energy has been sent to Quoi to fuel the Cotati's invasion. Scarlet Witch tries to contact Black Panther about the status only to be told by Shuri that Wakanda is under siege.

Empyre: X-Men
One year ago in the Sanctum Sanctorum, Doctor Strange talks with Scarlet Witch about M-Day and that she has to embrace that sin. One month ago, she tried to revive the Mutants who died on Genosha. In the present, the Cotati have set up a base on Genosha in their planned invasion on Wakanda as its leader Ru'tuh-Baga is informed that the soil is rich with Vibranium. Science minister Qqoi brings his leader a zombie prisoner named Explodey Boy whose jaw had to be reattached. Explodey Boy informs Ru'tah-Baga that Genosha used to be filled with Mutants until 16,000,000 of them were all killed by Cassandra Nova and he is now undead. The Cotati are then attacked by the Mutant zombies and some of them are vegetarians. Meanwhile, in Val De Sin, Paris, France, Warren Worthington III is having salad with M outside of Noblesse Pharmaceuticals Corporation HQ until Magik tells them that their break is over. She also informed them that Professor X sent them over to keep an eye on them to make sure they do not mess up. The three of them travel to Krakoa where Black Tom Cassidy informs Professor X that something is choking the life from the greenest of tendrils. Professor X stat that they will send someone to investigate it. Angel informs Professor X about the meeting as Professor X has a mission for them. Angel assembles Monet and Magik for his team as Magneto states that he can take one more civilian with him. This leads to Angel bringing Jamie Madrox with them to help out with the mission. They witness the Cotati running from the Mutant zombies and attack both sides as one of Jamie Madrox's clones finds vines around the Genosha gate. As Jamie works to get rid of the vines around the Genosha gate without destroying it, Monet identifies the Mutant zombies as the slain Genoshans. When the gate activates, the Genoshan zombies are hit with a fog that was emitted when Hordeculture members Augusta Bromes, Edith Scutch, Lily Leymus, and Opal Vetiver come through and confront Angel's group with knowledge on the plants.

Angel tries to get Hordeculture to leave in the midst of the chaos on Genosha as they state that they are here to take samples. After killing a Cotati, Angel tries to get them to leave only for Augusta to spray him with something that causes him to see Augusa, Edith, Lily, and Opal as young women. It also affected some of Jamie Madrox' clones who help out Hordeculture. Both groups are then attacked by the Cotati and Genoshan zombies. Magik demands to the Cotati strike commander to gather his forces and leave Earth as Augusta gets a sample of him. Magik's group and Hordeculture hold a truce to stop the Cotati from fleeing as Magik summons some demons from Limbo to assist them. Explodey Boy follows Qqoi onto a warship as Qqoi activates a seed pod-type weapon that turns it into a weapon that will self-destruct. Back on Krakoa, Sage contacts Black Tom Cassidy stating that the Genoshan Gate is down. Creating Little Tom Cassidy as his proxy, he instructs Angel to take him down to Magik. When two of Hordeculture's members state that black walnut trees have a toxic root system that keeps plants away from it, Black Tom Cassidy creates more copies to bring down the seed pod. While finding out that it is immune to psychic attacks, Magik had to persuade Hordeculture to take their leave. With help from Black Tom Cassidy, Magik asks for any psychic mutants to come to Genosha and deal with the seed pod. Emerging from the Genoshan gate are Exodus, Lady Mastermind, Mastermind, Mister Sinister, Quentin Quire, Shadow King, Selene, and the Stepford Cuckoos.

As the X-Men and the psychic mutants continue working to defeat the seed pod while contending with the Cotati and the Genoshan zombies, Magik brings Opal to Krakoa to meet up with Beast. He is instructed to oversee the creation of a potion that involves toxic material from a black walnut tree and to kill her if she fails, Monet, Jamie Madrox, Edith, and Lily are confronted by Explodey Boy who the Cotati recognize as the one who killed Qqoi. He offers a deal to keep the Cotati off their back in exchange that he keeps the bits of their prime cuts. Jamie accepts the terms as Explodey Boy advises Jamie and those with him to take cover. They do that as Explodey Boy takes out some Cotati with his explosion. After Beast and Opal succeed, Black Tom Cassidy tries to contact Magik to no avail. This causes Nightcrawler to teleport the bio-weapons to Genosha. Magik saves one of the Stepford Cuckoos from a group of Genoshan zombies. The X-Men and the psychic mutants start making use of the bio-weapons. When Magik and one of the Stepford Cuckoos enters the seed pod, Magik is entranced by some power which turns her into a full demon as everyone is informed of this. Meanwhile, Jamie and those with them find Explodey Boy and the Genoshan zombies with him eating parts of Jamie's clones. Angel, Augusta, and Opal witnessed Nightcrawler's work as a transformed Magik starts to cast a spell and declares herself the Zombie Queen of Genosha. Jamie, Monet, Lily, and Edith enter the seed pod and find a giant brain that the Genoshan zombies are feeding on. It is explained that the brain is part of the Cotatinaught that hatched from the seed pod, and it fully develops its body after it had fed off the Genoshan zombies and the Cotati zombies.

In a flashback, Scarlet Witch found that her magic revived the dead Genoshans as zombies. Upon bringing this up with Doctor Strange, he decides that he must clean up this zombie mess as he instructs Wong to cancel their reservation at Le Coucou. Once it is done, Doctor Strange states that it will take 30 days for the spell to be fully undone. 29 days into the present, the Cotatinaught is on a rampage. After a flashback with Opal, Beast was able to use Hordeculture's tech to revive Explodey Boy who confronts his zombie counterpart and talk about how he was revived as well as a reconciling with Explodey Boy's father. As Magik continues her fight with the Cotatinaught, the Zombie Explodey Boy takes Explodey Boy's jet pack and flies into the Cotatinaught's mouth. He explodes enough to destroy the Cotatinaught which also killed the Cotati that were associated with it. Magik then declares herself as the only power paramount on Genosha. Before she can continue, the spell is worn off as Magik regains control of herself and the Genosha zombies turn to dust. The X-Men allow Hordeculture to take their leave. Scarlet Witch is shown by the fireplace reading a book while shedding a tear.

Lords of Empyre
Years ago, on Tarnax IV, Princess Anelle is advised by the Skrull guards to persuade Empress R'Kill to evacuate as Galactus is preparing to consume Tarnax IV. Princess Anelle recaps on when she fell in love with Mar-Vell and gave birth to Hulkling. A few months ago, Teddy gets a text from Wiccan with the Strikeforce asking what he is up to. Pulling off a shapeshifting trick, Teddy fools Wiccan by claiming that he is with Spider-Man. While visiting Krakoa at the time when they had obtained an M'Kraan Crystal, Teddy is with Prodigy and Speed telling them how he has become useless. During their discussion, they are approached by Raksor and Bel-Dann who want to speak to Teddy where they want them to bring the Kree and the Skrull to an alliance in order to combat a growing threat on the Moon. Their meeting is crashed by some Skrull soldiers that make up the Children of Lost Tarnax who called them heretics. A fight breaks out until Teddy becomes Hulkling and grabs the Sword of Space which frightens the remaining Children of Tarnax. After a flashback to his childhood with his mother, Hulkling visits Wiccan stating that he has to save the universe as Wiccan allows him to explain. 52 minutes later, Hulkling has finished telling Wiccan about what happened, and Wiccan supports his mission. Upon being beamed up to the Imperial Flagship, Hulkling meets with Tanalth the Translator who names him Dorekk VIII of the newly-found Kree/Skrull Alliance. Before teleporting home, Wiccan enchants Hulkling's ring to give Hulkling extra protection. When Tanalth the Pursuer wants to deal with the Empyre's insurgency, Hulkling states that they should do a peace offering first. She then introduces the royal guards that will be working for Hulkling like Captain Glory and the Kree/Skrull sorceress M'ur-Ginn of the Knights of the Infinite. When the latest member is revealed to be Super-Skrull, Hulkling punches him for what he did to his mother. Super-Skrull stated that he actually slew the chambermaid that raised him after absconding him from Princess Anelle which he now regrets. After breaking up the argument, Tanalth the Pursuer explains that the Kree and Skrull fleets are proceeding to the Titan stargate near Saturn. He does suggest they make a stop first. Hulking visits Mar-Vell's grave where he states that his mom has told him about his heroics. Afterwards, Hulking and those with him are attacked by Kree zealots. Wiccan returns to help fight them off. Hulkling allows the surviving members to retreat when he gets word that Raksor and Bel-Dann are dead. The next day, Tanlath the Pursuer, M'ur-Ginn, and Super-Skrull mention that Wiccan has interfered in their goals causing Hulkling to tragically break up with him and have him return to Earth. Wiccan leaves quoting "All hail the Emperor Dorekk. Long in glory may he reign." Tanalth the Translator contacts the captain of the Kree zealots who she had secretly been in league with. To tie up some loose ends, Tanalth has the computer of the Kree zealots' scout-ship set to self-destruct using the authorization Pursuer-Hala-Six which destroys everyone on board. Wiccan secretly returns having figured out that Hulkling was not with Spider-Man and shows his support to his goals. Before leaving, Wiccan states that he will be at home when he returns.

At the Blue Area of the Moon, the Swordsman Cotati prepares Quoi for his fight against a plant in the form of Mantis. She enters his mind that details how Mantis and Swordsman met. The Mantis copy states to Quoi that he is supposed to be a unifier. There is also a flashback to when Mantis married the Swordsman Cotati. Using phosphorus, Quoi destroys the Mantis copy. The real Mantis states that she is light years away and that they are not done. Following a flashback to his childhood, Quoi is told by Mantis that he can prevent his father's plans to cause a massacre. Quoi probes Mantis' mind that shows her with the Guardians of the Galaxy at the time when they fought the Annihilation Wave. Cotati destroys the Mantis copy by regressing it to flowers. Sensing this happening, Mantis contacts the Avengers stating to them that the Kree and the Skrull are coming to deal with the Cotati and that they must let them if she can't reach them in time.

In the past on the Cotati homeworld of Tamal, the Swordsman Cotati watches as Quoi is a guest of honor to the Cotati Elders. He takes Quoi on a trip to Earth in order to bring Swordsman's blade to his grave. Though they will have to steal it from Avengers Tower first. Captain America and Iron Man find Swordsman's blade stolen. At the Temple of the Priests of Pama, vines grow out of it. At Alchemax's Seoul HQ, its vice-president Lenoora Yoon sends the footage of it to Alchemax Genetics' director Robert Chandler. In the highlands of Vietnam, Quoi and the Swordsman Cotati are traveling through the jungle as the Swordsman Cotati states that he is a "creature of warring halves". When they find an Alchemax team at the temple trying to harvest the newly-grown trees, they end up in a fight until Quoi uses Swordsman's sword to cut one of the plants and give it to the Alchemax team as a way to get them to leave the temple. Later that night, Quoi and the Swordsman Cotati approach one of the trees as the Swordsman Cotati states that he is returning home while hugging the tree that is his original form. After a talk with Quoi, the Swordsman Cotati merges with the tree. At Alchemax Tower in Manhattan, Robert hears from Lenoora that it will take 30 years before the specimen is fully grown which does not, please him. This causes Robert to send a team to cut down all the trees at the temple. The Swordsman Cotati emerges from his tree and slaughters the Alchemax team. When Quoi arrives, the Swordsman Cotati compares what they did to how Galactus consumes worlds. Returning to Tamal, Quoi creates a new sword as he orders the Cotati elders to let his father join their meeting. When the Swordsman Cotati enters the meeting, Quoi offers to be his sword.

Captain Marvel
At the farthest edges of the galaxy, a ship containing Kree and Skrull soldiers is in the middle of a losing battle with the Cotati. They are saved by Captain Marvel wielding the Universal Weapon. The ship then plans to set a course to join the rest of the Kree/Skrull Armada on Earth. On the Kree/Skrull command ship, Captain Marvel gives her status report to Hulkling. Captain Marvel talks privately with Invisible Woman about the Universal Weapon's strong abilities when Thing comes in mentioning that situation has come up. Hulkling needs Captain Marvel to accuse someone. En route to the planet Mar-da'en, Captain Marvel is told by a transmission from Hulkling that Ki'nal is an experimental city that has since become a sanctuary city for the Kree and the Skrull. It has now destroyed because of one of the Kree soldiers. With the culprit pinned down by a squad led by Commander Raz-El sent to bring her in, Captain Marvel is briefed on the culprit whose traps have filled up Commander Raz-El's infirmary. Using the Universal Weapon, Captain Marvel was able to get the culprit to yield. She introduces herself as Lauri-Ell who explains her motives. Using the divine parts of the Universal Weapon, Captain Marvel learns that Lauri-Ell was grown in a laboratory and that her mother was Mari-Ell making her Captain Marvel's half-sister. Captain Marvel had no choice but to spare her. Commander Raz-El has one of his soldiers inform Hulkling of what happened which surprises him.

Captain Marvel explains herself in a transmission to Hulkling stating that no lone Kree could've leveled Ki'nal on their own and that the suspect was the half-sister she never knew about. As she returns to Ki'nal to continue her investigation, Captain Marvel states to Hulkling that she left Lauri-Ell somewhere safe while having someone keep an eye on her. At Carol's apartment, Lauri-Ell is being observed by Chewie. Back on the planet Mar-da'en, Carol states to Commander Raz-El that Hulkling is allowing her to continue her investigation. She meets up with Wastrel (the alias of Walter S. Lawson) who is still serving his 10 years of community service to Kree. Using the Universal Weapon, Captain Marvel discovers that Lauri-Ell hasn't committed a crime and it is not showing the perpetrator. As Lauri-Ell goes shopping with Chewie while wearing some of Captain Marvel's clothes, she finds herself protecting a girl from the Cotati. Captain Marvel arrives to help Lauri-Ell fight the Cotati. Chewie starts to eat some of the Cotati. After a fight with the Cotati, Captain Marvel visits Doctor Strange to talk about the Universal Weapon's influence. Doctor Strange states that there would be ramifications to the next set of actions. Also present are Hazmat, Spider-Woman, and War Machine. Doctor Strange uses magic to make copies of the Universal Weapon for Hazmat, Spider-Woman, and War Machine to wield.

As Hazmat, Spider-Woman, and War Machine meet Lauri-Ell, Carol talks with her and gives her a device to call her for an emergency like the Cotati attacking. On the command ship, Carol contacts Hulkling about her lead. 11 minutes later, Hulking found that Carol had the Universal Weapon copied and given to those with her. Hulking expects Carol to have Doctor Strange put the Universal Weapon back together when she is done to avoid the Kree seeing what happened. When Carol asks to check the status on Walter Lawson, Hulking finds out that Walter escaped on Day 2. Returning to Mar-Da'en, Captain Marvel, Hazmat, Spider-Woman, and War Machine are attacked by Kree robots. Captain Marvel finally confronts Wastrel who has declared vengeance against the aliens he hates as he attacks in a giant tentacled robot. When the robot is destroyed, the Universal Weapon reveals that Wastrel was the culprit and Captain Marvel declares him accused. They take Wastrel into their custody. Back on Earth, Lauri-Ell and Chewie are watching TV when they are visited by Carol's friend Marina Renner who states that the Cotati took her daughter Kit. Arriving in Brooklyn where Marina last saw Kit, Lauri-Ell finds the Cotati there and calls for Carol.

Captain Marvel, Hazmat, Spider-Woman, War Machine, and Lauri-Ell are fighting the Cotati. Lauri-Ell informs them about the trapped humans. They fight their way past the Cotati and the plants to get to the trapped humans. The spell that Doctor Strange used to duplicate the Universal Weapon wears off as Captain Marvel drops the Universal Weapon. Lauri-Ell grabs the Universal Weapon and uses it to reabsorb the energies from it as she becomes an Accuser to free Captain Marvel and her allies and resume rescuing the trapped humans. Then they destroy the Cotati's nest. The humans are rescued, and Kit is reunited with Marina as Kit also meets Lauri-Ell. Spider-Woman advises anyone who doesn't have any injuries to go home immediately. As Lauri-Ell gives Captain Marvel the Universal Weapon back, she leaves Lauri-Ell to guard Wastrel in his cryo-sleep pod where she will take both of them to Hulkling when this is over so that she can clear Lauri-Ell's name and have Wastrel face justice. Several weeks later at Captain Marvel's semi-secret underlake base in Harpswell, Maine, Captain Marvel is visited by Lauri-Ell who is now a full-time Accuser. The two of them later visit their mother's grave

Empyre: Captain America
In Arlington, Virginia, the army is fighting a losing battle against the Cotati led by Shi Qaanth until Captain America arrives. When the soldier Bennett snipes Shi Qaanth, he sends a vine which strikes him. Before he disintegrates, Shi Qaanth states their bones will nourish the Earth. Captain America gets to know Sergeant Major Cherry, Sergeant Russo, Specialist Bennett, and First Lieutenant Herrero while complimenting their actions. At the Pentagon, the Cotati are laying siege until Captain America arrives with the soldiers. Having a major grant, him an audience with General James Woodley, Captain America briefs him on the Cotati and advises that the snipers and artillery target the ones that wield staffs. General Woodley states that he cannot spare any of his soldiers to deal with the attacks in South America and Mexico. Upon leaving, Captain America gains some of the soldiers as his allies for the upcoming attacks. General Woodley is visited by Specialist Bennett who carries a message involving Shi Qaanth's will as he emits plans that go into General Woodley. Near Mexico City, Shi Qaanth states to his soldiers that Earth's armies will soon serve the Cotati. To further the attack on Mexico, Shi Qaanth turns some of the ground into a gigantic monster.

As the Cotati attack San Antonio, Texas, Captain America is prepared to lead the soldiers into a counter-attack when he notices the Kree/Skrull Alliance showing up to attack the Cotati. Captain America reprimands the Kree and Skrull soldiers for endangering the humans when they state that they are here to fight the Cotati only. In addition, they state that Shi Qaanth has raised a creature of tree and stone called the Man of Earth that is heading to Mexico City. Captain America contacts General Woodley about the Man of Earth as he is told by Woodley that he is heading to NATO now so that Captain America can get his army. He is unaware that Specialist Bennett and General Woodley are infected by the Cotati. After one of his stories, Captain America finds that Specialist Bennett was infected as he and those with him gun down Bennett and the infected soldiers. Then he asks the Kree and the Skrull soldiers that they will need their fastest warship upon figuring out that General Woodley was acting weird. At NATO HQ in Brussels, Belgium, General Woodley speaks before the assembly who ask if he has come to ask for military assistants. Shi Qaanth speaks through him as General Woodley and those that were infected attack the assembly. Captain America arrives with the soldiers and takes out the infected. He confirms to the surviving members that the Cotati are threatening Earth to take out all animal life as well as the Man of Stone making its way to Mexico City. The surviving members of the assembly agree to lend their military aid to the fight against the Cotati.

In Mexico City, the Cotati and the Man of Stone have begun their attack. Captain America arrives with the military and the Kree and Skrull soldiers to combat the invasion. Captain America advises the Kree and Skrull soldiers to hold off the Cotati while the civilians get to safety. They do that as some U.S. soldiers are killed in the conflict. To slow the advancing Cotati, the different soldiers fire at the fuel tanks of cars to delay the Cotati while the Kree and Skrull warships are attacking the Man of Stone. When the Man of Stone causes a faultline, Captain America interrogates a Cotati on where Shi Qaanth is. Figuring out what the Cotati said, Captain America takes a glider and flies towards the Man of Stone to confront Shi Qaanth. Upon being entangled in vines, Captain America learns that the Man of Stone is being controlled by Shi Qaanth's staff. Using his shield, Captain America destroys the staff causing the Man of Stone to crumble. One day later, Captain America is found by the military where he is informed that the Cotati were teleported away upon the Man of Stone's defeat. Captain America is told by a soldier that NATO HQ has been calling him to let him know about something big happening in Wakanda.

Empyre: Savage Avengers
Conan is at a lucha libre match where he is not impressed with the modern-day fights. He does get involved in a fight with some spectators that were offended by his comment. The lucha libre match is interrupted by a Cotati command ship with plans to turn the humans into fertilizer. As the Cotati attack, Conan comes to the defense of the civilians by fighting the Cotati as he suspects that they have connections with Kulan Gath. The arrow that hit Conan on the arm knocks him out. When he regains consciousness, he is nearly eaten by the Frost Giant Atali who had bad nightmares about him only to be saved by Venom. Conan snaps out of it and finds that he is still in Mexico City as a giant plant is ravaging it. Venom gives him an uprooted parking meter which Conan improvises as a cudgel where they fight the Cotati. One of them kills a man on a rideable lawnmower. Before the man dies, Conan learns how to operate it as he uses it on the Cotati. Venom throws the tanker truck towards the giant plant which destroys it. Conan and Venom then go out for tacos.

X-Men
After being examined by an unknown alien race, Vulcan awakens at the Summer House on the Moon and is greeted by Petra and Sway. After having a drink with them, Vulcan goes for a walk and arrives at the Blue Area of the Moon where the Cotati are at work. He is soon attacked by them as an explosion from the fight is seen by Petra and Sway. As the Cotati use one of their plans to probe his mind, Vulcan sees the same aliens again stating that he now has a microscopic measure that would become worse than cancer. When the aliens release them, Vulcan fights off the plant and creates an explosion. He takes down the Cotati as Petra and Sway show up. A letter is shown that Cyclops and Jean Grey have taken the children to Shi'ar space and that they'll be home after dinner. Meanwhile, the unnamed Cotati general is informed by Hhurr that they lost the entire sunward node which was somehow atomized. Hhurr informed the general that the only survivor of the attack muttered "Krakoa" before he died.

At Arrako Point, Rockslide, Loa, and Anole meet with the Summoner of Arrako where he teaches them the game of weakness which gets interrupted when a Cotati fleet approaches Krakoa. The next day, Exodus speaks to the younger mutants that were evacuated to Krakoa about the events that happened yesterday. It all started when Magneto was meditating when Gorgon and Magik come in and inform him about a Cotati incursion approaching Krakoa. Donning his outfit, Magneto heads out to fight the Cotati and uses his magnetic abilities to send metal into some while rescuing Sophie Cuckoo. Using telepathy, Sophie enables Magneto to contact Mindee Cuckoo and Sage as he instructs her to find Magma and Iceman. As Black Tom Cassidy is holding back the Cotati invaders, Iceman is assisting Storm while Esme Cuckoo has found Magma in the southwest of Krakoa. Magneto advises Magma to set off one of Krakoa's dormant volcanoes while not getting carried away as they do not want an ecological disaster on their hands. Then Iceman is instructed by Magneto to cool down the lava that comes out. Magneto proceeds to use the now metallic lava on the Cotati while saving Toad from Hhurr. Magneto advises the Cotati general to take his forces, leave Krakoa, and never return. When the Cotati general doesn't take the advice, Magneto rains down Sage's satellites as he advises Mindee to apologize to Sage for sacrificing her satellites. Then he asks Sage to activate the closest gateway to the Moon where the X-Men will put an end to all of this. Exodus finishes his story as Magneto is seen assisting the X-Men in fighting the Cotati on the Moon.

Aftermath
Years ago, when Galactus attacked Tarnax IV, Anelle admitted to R'Kill that her child is alive on Earth. R'Kill has a claim that the Kree and the Skrull will be united one day. Then she uses the Transmatter Device in her crown to teleport off of Tarnax IV leaving Anelle behind. In the brig of the Kree/Skrull Alliance's flagship, Hulkling has heard R'Kill's story and was displeased that she left Anelle to die. R'Kill admitted that Tanlath the Pursuer was long dead in the Skrull's dungeons and how R'Kill underwent special treatment and Power Skrull technology to mimic her speed and strength. She killed the Skrulls involved and assumed Tanlath's form in order to infiltrate Hala where she took advantage of the Inhuman takeover, the destruction of Hala, the death of Ronan the Accuser, and the defection of the Supreme Intelligence to the rebels as well as mentioning what she did to his grandfather. R'Kill asks him how the wedding went. Yesterday on the command deck, Hulkling and Wiccan have gotten married. The Kree and Skrul elders made Wiccan the Prince-Consort and Court Wizard to the Kree/Skrull Alliance. At the reception attended by everyone who knows Hulkling and Wiccan, Captain America, Thor, and Tony Stark recap on how they wouldn't let Hulkling and Wiccan join the Avengers as well as doing a toast to Mar-Vell. Captain Marvel speaks to Hulking and Wiccan stating that Mar-Vell would be proud of them, and Lauri-Ell will make them proud as an Accuser. Abigail Brand asks Hulkling if she may have a word with Captain Marvel. He allows it. Abigail tells Captain Marvel about how the Alpha Flight Space Program didn't detect the Cotati operating in the Blue Area of the Moon. She also states that the Alpha Flight Space Program cannot function as a team if they are "caught in the loop". As Hulkling tries to break up the discussion, Abigail Brand announces her resignation from the Alpha Flight Space Program. Hulkling informs the Kree elder that they will offer their own apology later while Invisible Woman states to Tony Stark that the Alpha Flight Space Program wouldn't have made the same calls as they have. As Hulkling orders that the party should resume, the rest of the Young Avengers show up. Back in the present, R'Kill states to Hulkling that the Alliance will shatter one day and that Hulkling will die wishing that he'd listen to her. Hulkling then makes Super-Skrull pay for what he did to his foster mother by making him live with his actions and transferring him to diplomatic services effective immediately. As Captain Glory tries to talk Hulkling out of the same sentence, there is a flashforward where Captain Glory and Hulkling are weakened in some ruins while noting that R'Kill was right. He is then confronted by Abigail Brand who is leading her own team claiming that she made something better as she orders Hulkling to come with her.

Nick Fury's Unseen form has watched as the Avengers, the Fantastic Four, the Kree/Skrull Alliance, and the Cotati lay rest to the oldest war in the universe. Franklin Richards, Valeria Richards, Spider-Man, and Wolverine arrive with Alicia Masters, Jo-Venn, and N'kalla. Hulkling arrives where Jo-Venn and N'kalla meet him. As Quoi is in a Vibranium bondage, Wolverine detects a presence nearby as Thor stating that they are being observed by the Unseen. Iron Man had questioned Quoi about the Cotati's rifles where he has no knowledge on who built them. The Profiteer arrives on Mister Fantastic's request to see if she has any knowledge of the Cotati weapons. She states that she can track it down at a price that will be discussed later. As the Cotati are released from their Vibranium bondages, Invisible Woman prevents Quoi from attacking his "uncle" Thor. Franklin uses his powers to bring the Cotati to an uninhabited planet that is far from Midgard, Skrullos, and Hala where they won't be of any harm. Thor uses the blessing of Gaea to make the barren planet filled with life. This was enough to appease Quoi as Thor takes Invisible Woman and Franklin Storm back to the others. Back on the Blue Area of the Moon, Mister Fantastic, Captain Marvel, Thing, Wolverine, Alicia, Jo-Venn, and N'kalla explore the tunnels where Bel-Dann and Raksor lived and commit their ashes to a specific spot on the ground. Spider-Man mentions to Human Torch that they had to take Jo-Venn and N'kalla to Disneyland before arriving on the Blue Area of the Moon while also mentioning how he gained a soulmate in Sky. The Profiteer finishes her analysis of the Cotati's weapons and doesn't know who made them while stating that the energy powering them is ancient enough to predate her and the rest of the Elders of the Universe. As the Profiteer claims the crystalline batteries as part of the payment, she wants the children as well much to the dismay of everyone present. The Profiteer brings up the contract that any Kree and Skrull children must be fighting somewhere as decreed by Colonel Kal-Torr and General J'Bahzz. Hulkling destroys the contract stating that there are no more Kree and Skrull empires anymore as they are now under his management. This causes the Profiteer to take her leave. Hulkling then places Jo-Venn and N'kalla into the care of Thing and Alicia. After everyone takes their leave, the Unseen uses his powers to bring the weapons to him. As he analyzes the weapons and gets an idea on the first race in question, the Unseen is overcome with energy as a one-eyed Uatu the Watcher is brought back to life. When the Unseen asks how he's back from the dead and to at least say something, all Uatu can say is "There shall be...a reckoning."

On the Bowie, Guardians of the Galaxy members Groot, Hercules, Marvel Boy, Moondragon, Quasar, and Rocket Raccoon arrive at the Proscenium where the Galactic Council meets. Marvel Boy runs into Nova who is representing the Nova Corps as Marvel Boy is representing the Kree since Captain Marvel is unavailable. They meet with the other representatives like Lani Ko Ako of the Badoon Sisterhood, Super-Skrull of the Skrulls, Nymbus Sternhoff of the Kymellians, Emperor Stote of the Zn'rx who went to the restroom, Super-Skrull's subaltern Val-Korr, Mentacle of the Rigellians, Oracle-2 of the Shi'ar, Zoralis Gupa from the planet Silnius, Empress Victoria of Spartax, and Peacekeeper of the Chitauri. The representatives go into peace talks while bringing up the Pyre incident and Hulkling's marriage to Wiccan. Nova proposes that all pan-world treaties remain in force and all forbidden weaponry to be decommissioned which Empress Victoria supports. When Marvel Boy heads to the restroom, he finds Emperor Stote on the ground stating that someone stole his form as he dies. When Val-Korr comes in and accuses Marvel Boy of murder, Marvel Boy kills him in self-defense as Super-Skrull arrives and brings this up with the other representatives. Nova, Oracle-2, and Empress Victoria speak out against what Super-Skrull intends to do with Marvel Boy. Nova calls in the Guardians of the Galaxy to investigate what happened to Emperor Stote. Earlier, Rocket Raccoon and Groot were in the restroom getting their thoughts together when they were briefly teleported to an unknown location with an island in the sky. After reviewing what had happened up to Emperor Stote's murder, Super-Skrull states that a Snarkwar has begun in the Zn'rx race to decide his successor and declines Oracle-2's suggestion of a mind-probe. When asked by Rocket Raccoon to shoot Noh-Varr in the head with Val-Korr's gun, he does and part of Super-Skrull's head gets shot off and regenerates. Rocket Raccoon states that the gun is a gene-scanner which kill anyone who uses it on a Kree and suspects that one of the representatives was responsible. He has the Proscenium's computer system initiate the voice override code 877-Delta for one hour, instructs Oracle-2 and Mentacle to scan the minds, has Moondragon scan Oracle-2 and Mentacle's minds at the same time. The scan goes on until it reaches the mind of Peacekeeper as he initiates a bio-bomb on his chest while stating that he was to bring peace to the enemies who despise hive-kind. As Hercules and Phyla-Vell restrain Peacekeeper, Nova and Noh-Varr work to disarm the bio-bomb as Rocket Raccoon figures out that Lani Ko Ako is the true culprit since the Badoon Sisterhood have never left their planet nor sent anyone to represent them. He continues on stating that the culprit started the Snarkwar, made use of an image inducer and gave Val-Korr the gun which was rigged. Now that the jig is up as well as the fact that the Elders of the Universe can survive a Chitauri bio-bomb, Lani Ko Ako deactivates her image inducer revealing that she is the Profiteer. She reveals that she interfered in the peace meeting since it would put her out of work of selling weapons to feuding sides. After Zoralis Gupa takes an urgent call while mentioning to the person on the other side to warn all neighboring systems, he tells Victoria that it's the End of Everything as different planets are starting to die in the planets owned by the Shi'ar, the Kree/Skrull Alliance, and the Zn'rx while rendering the galactic economy fragile enough to go bankrupt. Knowing that she won't make a profit, the Profiteer teleports Peacekeeper and the bio-bomb away. While thanking Zoralis Gupa for fooling the Profiteer with the bluff, Zoralis Gupa states to Super-Skrull and everyone present that something darker than Galactus is destroying the worlds and its name is Knull.

At the Outer Rim, a Kree/Skrull Alliance armada is passing by. General Kalamari of the Skrulls discovers an escape pod with a warning not to rescue it. The armada does so, and the technicians open it to find Talos inside as he passes out. Two days later, Talos awakens with Kalamari by his side and advises that they leave the Outer Rim immediately. He reveals that Emperor Hulkling dispatched him to investigate the Kree and Skrull bases that went dark with Av-Rom, Keeyah, M'lanz, Virtue, and Tarna. En route to Gnarrat, Talos' group comes across an escape pod where they find a Symbiote in it. The Symbiotes start to infect Talos' group as the ship is then attacked by Symbiote Dragons. As his surviving teammates are evacuated, Talos soon finds himself facing Knull and his infected teammates as he plans to devour the entire galaxy. Talos escapes into his escape pod which is launched from his ship where it self-destructs to buy him some time. Back in the present, Talos informs Kalamari that his distress beacon is a warning that Knull is coming. Outside the ship, Knull is riding a Symbiote Dragon as he swoops in for an attack.

Issues involved

Prelude
 Incoming! (December 2019)
 Road to Empyre: The Kree/Skrull War #1 (March 2020)
 Empyre: Avengers #0 (June 2020)
 Empyre: Fantastic Four #0 (July 2020)

Main
 Empyre #1–6 (July–September 2020)

Solicited tie-ins
 Captain Marvel (vol. 10) #18–21 (July–September 2020)
 Empyre Handbook #1 (July 2020)
 Empyre: Avengers #1–3 (July–August 2020)
 Empyre: Captain America #1–3 (July–August 2020)
 Empyre: The Immortal She-Hulk #1 (September 2020)
 Empyre: Savage Avengers #1 (July 2020)
 Empyre: X-Men #1–4 (July–August 2020)
 Fantastic Four (vol. 6) #21–23 (July–September 2020)
 Lords of Empyre: Celestial Messiah #1 (August 2020)
 Lords of Empyre: Emperor Hulkling #1 (July 2020)
 Lords of Empyre: Swordsman #1 (August 2020)
 X-Men (vol. 5) #10–11 (July–August 2020)

Aftermath issues
 Empyre: Aftermath Avengers #1 (September 2020)
 Empyre Fallout: Fantastic Four #1 (September 2020)
 Web of Venom: Empyre's End #1 (October 2020)
 Guardians of the Galaxy Vol. 6 #7-8 (October–November 2020)

Cancelled tie-ins
A number of titles were removed from the storyline checklist due to the COVID-19 pandemic:

 Empyre: Ghost Rider #1
 Empyre: The Invasion of Wakanda #1–3
 Empyre: Spider-Man #1–3
 Empyre: Squadron Supreme #1–2
 Empyre: Stormranger #1–3
 Empyre: Thor #1–3
 Strikeforce #10
 The Union #1–3 (of 5) (this title was resolicited as a tie-in to the King in Black crossover event)

Reception
According to the aggregate website ComicBookRoundup, the typical issue of the core series received an average score of 7.2/10.

The series won in the Outstanding Comic Book category at the 32nd GLAAD Media Awards.

Collected editions

Notes

References

External links
 

2020 in comics
Avengers (comics) storylines
Fantastic Four storylines
Alien invasions in comics
Comics set on fictional planets
GLAAD Media Award for Outstanding Comic Book winners